The silent grass mouse or slate-bellied akodont (Akodon surdus) is a species of rodent in the family Cricetidae. It is endemic to Peru.

Distribution and habitat
The silent grass mouse lives primarily in the Cusco Region in the south east of Peru at altitudes of between 1,500 and 3,000m. Its habitat is generally confined to humid montane forests and it can also persist in selectively logged areas.

Threats
The grass mouse is listed as a vulnerable species on the IUCN Red List and its numbers are thought to be decreasing. This is mainly due to human settlement, commercial clearcutting and farmland creation which is degrading and declining the Andean forests where the grass mouse lives.

References

Musser, G. G. and M. D. Carleton. 2005. Superfamily Muroidea. pp. 894–1531 in Mammal Species of the World a Taxonomic and Geographic Reference. D. E. Wilson and D. M. Reeder eds. Johns Hopkins University Press, Baltimore.

Akodon
Mammals of Peru
Mammals described in 1917
Taxa named by Oldfield Thomas
Taxonomy articles created by Polbot